Pentti Akseli Virrankoski (born 20 June 1929 in Vancouver) is a Finnish historian, PhD 1964. Virrankoski was professor in Finland's history at Turku University from 1978 to 1992. 

Virrankoski has in his research focused on economic and social history. Amongst his works are a great biography of Anders Chydenius. He has also written the first academic student book about Finland's economic history (1975), two books about North American Indians, and a work on Ostrobothnia (1997) and a biography of the musician Heikki Klemetti (2004).

References 
 Uppslagsverket Finland, 5 (2007)

External links 
Huvuddragen i Österbottens äldre bosättningshistoria

1929 births
Living people
20th-century Finnish historians
Academic staff of the University of Turku